Stanley James Mountain (third ¼ 1909 – death unknown) was a rugby union and professional rugby league footballer who played in the 1920s and 1930s.

Background
Stan Mountain's birth was registered in Newport district, Wales.

Playing career

International honours
Stan Mountain won caps for Wales (RL) while at Huddersfield in 1935.

Challenge Cup Final appearances
Stan Mountain played , i.e. number 2, in Huddersfield's 8–11 defeat by Castleford in the 1934–35 Challenge Cup Final during the 1934–35 season at Wembley Stadium, London on Saturday 4 May 1935, in front of a crowd of 39,000.

County Cup Final appearances
Stan Mountain played right-, i.e. number 3, and scored a try in Huddersfield's 8–14 defeat by Leeds in the 1937–38 Yorkshire County Cup Final during the 1937–38 season at Belle Vue, Wakefield on Saturday 30 October 1937.

Genealogical information
Stan Mountain's marriage to Vera (née Lodge) was registered during fourth ¼ 1941 in Huddersfield district. They had children; Margaret Mountain (birth registered during first ¼  in Huddersfield district, Anne Mountain (birth registered during third ¼  in Huddersfield district), Stuart Mountain (birth registered during first ¼  in Huddersfield district), Kathryn Mountain (birth registered during fourth ¼  in Newport district).

References

External links
Profile at blackandambers.co.uk

1909 births
Huddersfield Giants players
Newport RFC players
Year of death missing
Rugby league centres
Rugby league wingers
Rugby League XIII players
Rugby union centres
Rugby league players from Newport, Wales
Wales national rugby league team players
Welsh rugby league players
Welsh rugby union players
Rugby union players from Newport, Wales